PSE may refer to:

Companies and organizations

Stock exchanges 
Pacific Stock Exchange, stock exchange in USA
 Pakistan Stock Exchange, stock exchange of Pakistan
 Palestine Securities Exchange, stock exchange in Palestine
 Philippine Stock Exchange, stock exchange in Philippines
 Prague Stock Exchange, stock exchange in the Czech Republic
 Pune Stock Exchange, stock exchange in India

Other
Paksi SE, a Hungarian football club based in Paks, Hungary
 Paris School of Economics, a French academic foundation in Paris
 Partido Socialista de Euskadi, a Basque Party
 Party of European Socialists (French: Parti socialiste européen)
 Group of the Party of European Socialists, a parliamentary group in the European Parliament 1993–2009
 Pegula Sports and Entertainment, American sports and entertainment holding company based in Buffalo, New York
Philosophical Society of England
Pi Sigma Epsilon, a professional fraternal organization in sales, marketing, and management
 Polskie Sieci Elektroenergetyczne, an electricity transmission system operator in Poland
 PSE Archery, an archery bow and crossbow supply company
 Puget Sound Energy, an energy utility company in Washington state, USA

Education 
 Personal and social education, a component of the state school curriculum in Wales and Scotland
 Personal, social, health and economic education, an element of the state school curriculum in England and Northern Ireland
 Post secondary education or higher education

Places
 State of Palestine, by ISO 3166-1 country code
 PSE, railway station code of Pasar Senen railway station in Jakarta, Indonesia

 PSE, the three-letter National Rail station code for Pitsea railway station.
PSE, airport code of Mercedita Airport in Puerto Rico
Stadion PSE, a stadium in Paks, Hungary

Technology
 Packet Switching Exchange
 Page Size Extension, paging mechanism in computer microprocessor
 PSE-36, a 36 bit extension of the mechanism
 Photoshop Elements, a consumer image manipulation program
 PlayStation Eye, a digital camera device for the PlayStation 3
 Power sourcing equipment, network devices that provide power in a Power over Ethernet setup
 PSE law, a Japanese standard for electrical appliance safety
Problem solving environment, specialized computer software
Process Systems Engineering, a category of engineering

Science and medicine
 Passive Seismic Experiment, one of the Apollo Lunar Surface Experiments Package experiments
 Periodic System of Elements, a tabular arrangement of the chemical elements
Photosensitive epilepsy, epilepsy seizures triggered by visual stimuli
 Picture superiority effect, a concept in cognitive psychology

Plant Systematics and Evolution, an academic journal
 Point of Subjective Equality (PSE) as used in psychophysics discrimination experiments
Portosystemic encephalopathy, a liver failure condition
 Present State Examination, tools created by WHO for diagnosing mental illness
 Probe Support Equipment, an element of the atmospheric entry probe Huygens
 Producer support estimate (formerly producer subsidy equivalent), a measure published by the OECD
Pseudoephedrine, a medication

Other
 Pidgin Sign English, a type of contact sign language
 Postal stationery envelope, a stamped envelope
 Public sector undertakings in India - a.k.a Public Sector Enterprises in India

See also
 TGV PSE, a French TGV train
 PSE meat, a carcass quality condition